Corymbia hylandii, commonly known as Hyland's bloodwood, is a species of small tree that is endemic to part of the Cape York Peninsula. It has rough, tessellated bark on the trunk and branches, lance-shaped adult leaves, flower buds in groups of seven, creamy white flowers and urn-shaped fruit.

Description
It has rough, tessellated, grey-brown or red-brown bark on the trunk and larger branches. Flowering has been observed in April and June and the flowers are creamy white.

Taxonomy and naming
Hyland's bloodwood was first formally described in 1987 by Denis Carr and Stella Carr and was given the name Eucalyptus hylandii. In 1995 Ken Hill and Lawrie Johnson changed the name to Corymbia hylandii. The specific epithet (hylandii) honours Bernie Hyland.

Distribution and habitat
Corymbia hylandii grows in shallow soil on sandstone and granite ridges and is widespread on the northern and eastern Cape York Peninsula from Bathurst Bay to Laura.

Conservation status
This eucalypt is classified as of "least concern" under the Queensland Government Nature Conservation Act 1992.

See also
 List of Corymbia species

References

hamersleyana
Myrtales of Australia
Flora of Queensland
Taxa named by Maisie Carr
Plants described in 1987